David Myles (born 7 February 1978 in Brisbane, Queensland, Australia) is a former professional rugby league footballer who played in the 1990s and 2000s. He played for the Gold Coast Titans, North Queensland Cowboys, Auckland Warriors and the Gold Coast Chargers in first grade. He also played for the United States national rugby league team.

Playing career
Myles started his career with the South Queensland Crushers but could not break into first grade. In 1998 he moved to join the Gold Coast Chargers and made his first grade debut on 5 April against the Brisbane Broncos. He won Rookie of the year in 1998. The Chargers folded at the end of the year and he spent 1999 with the Cronulla Sharks, spending a lot of the year in the NSWRL Premier League.

In 2000 he moved again, signing with the then Auckland Warriors. He received the Best Back award for 2000 and he played with the club for three seasons and played in 51 matches. He was an integral part of the club's first finals appearance in 2001. At the end of the 2002 season he moved again, signing with the North Queensland Cowboys. He played in 57 matches for the Cowboys, scoring 18 tries. He played his 100th first grade game during his time at the Cowboys. He also did not miss a game while at the club which showed his toughness and passion for the club. He played a very large role in the club's first finals appearance and also scored the only try in the Cowboys first finals appearance in Townsville beating big brothers Brisbane Broncos for the first time in the club's history.

Myles spent the 2006 season with Toulouse Olympique in France.

He then signed with the new Gold Coast Titans franchise in 2007. However he spent most of the season with the Tweed Heads Seagulls in the Queensland Cup, playing only four first grade matches for the Titans. Tweed Seagulls won the QLD Cup Grand Final that season with Myles scoring two tries. Myles also represented the United States in a 2007 World Cup qualifying match in which he scored a try. He retired playing professionally at the end of 2007 however still played with The USA national team which qualified for the 2013 World Cup. He scored a try in games against South Africa as well as Jamaica on the way to qualifying.

References 

1978 births
Living people
Australian people of American descent
Australian rugby league players
Gold Coast Chargers players
Gold Coast Titans players
Mount Albert Lions players
New Zealand Warriors players
North Queensland Cowboys players
Rugby league centres
Rugby league five-eighths
Rugby league fullbacks
Rugby league players from Brisbane
Rugby league wingers
Toulouse Olympique players
Tweed Heads Seagulls players
United States national rugby league team players